Hwang Hyeon-a (born 13 September 1994) is a South Korean field hockey player for the South Korean national team.

She participated at the 2018 Women's Hockey World Cup.

References

1994 births
Living people
South Korean female field hockey players
Female field hockey goalkeepers
Field hockey players at the 2018 Asian Games
Asian Games competitors for South Korea